The 2022–23 season is Wydad Athletic Club's 83rd season in existence and the club's 67th consecutive season in the top flight of Moroccan football. Wydad will participate in this season's edition of the Botola, the Champions League and the Throne Cup. As the reigning African champions, they will contest the CAF Super Cup against RS Berkane. Additionally, Wydad AC should have qualified for the annual FIFA Club World Cup. However, the tournament's status remain uncertain, following FIFA's proposal for a format overhaul.

Season events
On 26 February, Juan Carlos Garrido returned to Wydad AC as their new Head Coach.

Players

Out on loan

Transfers

In

Loans in

Out

Loans out

Released

Competitions

Overview

Botola

Results summary

Results by round

League table

Results

CAF Super Cup

FIFA Club World Cup

Throne Cup

CAF Champions League

Qualifying rounds

Group stage

Squad statistics

Appearances and goals

|-
|colspan="16"|Players away on loan:

|-
|colspan="16"|Players who left Wydad AC during the season:

|}

Goal scorers

Clean sheets

Disciplinary record

References

Wydad AC seasons
Wydad AC
Wydad AC